Dr. Crow is a studio album by Mick Farren and friends released in 2002 under the name The Deviants.

The album was recorded with longtime friends and collaborators Andy Colquhoun and Jack Lancaster and featured Wayne Kramer's backing band. Former Motörhead drummer Phil "Philthy Animal" Taylor guests on one track.

The 2004 release on the Japanese label Captain Trip Records differs slightly, as it adds two tracks (covers of "Strawberry Fields Forever" and "The Man Who Shot Liberty Valance") and uses a different running order and artwork (the latter still featuring the Dr. Crow character drawn by Edward Barker).

Track listing
"When Dr. Crow Turns on the Radio"
"You're Gonna Need Somebody on your Bond"
"The Murdering Officer"
"Sold to Babylon"
"Taste the Blue"
"Song of the Hired Guns"
"Diabolo's Cadillac"
"The Man Who Shot Liberty Valance" (Burt Bacharach, Hal David)
"Bela Lugosi 2002"
"A Long Dry Season"
"What Do You Want?"

Personnel
Mick Farren – vocals
Andy Colquhoun – guitar, bass, keyboards, vocals
Jack Lancaster – tenor and soprano saxophone
Doug Lunn – bass
Ric Parnell – drums
Michael Simmons – vocals
Johnette Napolitano – vocal duet on "You're Gonna Need Somebody on Your Bond"
The Deviettes (Johnette Napolitano, Carol Phillips, Blare N. Bitch) – vocals
Phil "Philthy Animal" Taylor – drums on "A Long Dry Season"

References

The Deviants (band) albums
2002 albums
Track Records albums